Kayrat Zhyrgalbek uulu (born June 13, 1993) is a Kyrgyz footballer who currently plays for Aksu.

Career

Club
In February 2019, Zhyrgalbek uulu went on trial with SKA-Khabarovsk.

Career statistics

International

International goals
Scores and results list Kyrgyzstan's goal tally first.

Honours
Dordoi Bishkek
Kyrgyz Premier League (3): 2018, 2019, 2020
Kyrgyzstan Cup (1): 2018

References

External links 

1993 births
Living people
Kyrgyzstan international footballers
Kyrgyzstani footballers
Sportspeople from Bishkek
FC Dordoi Bishkek players
FC Abdysh-Ata Kant players
Association football midfielders
Footballers at the 2014 Asian Games
Footballers at the 2018 Asian Games
2019 AFC Asian Cup players
Asian Games competitors for Kyrgyzstan